La Cresta, California may refer to:
La Cresta, Kern County, California
La Cresta, Riverside County, California
La Cresta, San Diego County, California

See also
La Cresta Village, California